Yahoo! Cricket was a cricket website based in India. While in name part of the US-based Yahoo!'s Yahoo! Sports, it is hosted and administered by Yahoo! India.

In February 2009, Yahoo! India signed a three-year partnership with the International Cricket Council (ICC), to become the exclusive online partner for all ICC events.  This includes the ICC World Twenty20, ICC Champions Trophy and ICC Cricket World Cup.  According to comScore, April 2009 data, Yahoo! Cricket was attracting 2.43 million unique users per month, which ranked it as the top cricket site in India.

In August 2021, Yahoo! India shut down the website because of new foreign direct investment regulations of India.

References

External links

Sports mass media in India
Cricket websites
Defunct websites
Internet properties disestablished in 2021
Cricket